The 2005–06 Liga Leumit season saw Maccabi Herzliya win the title and promotion to the Premier League. Runners-up Hakoah Amidar Ramat Gan were also promoted.

Ironi Rishon LeZion and Maccabi Be'er Sheva (playing in their first season at the second level) were relegated to Liga Artzit.

Final table

External links
Israel Second Level 2005/06 RSSSF

Liga Leumit seasons
Israel
2005–06 in Israeli football leagues